Hya or HYA may refer to:
 Hya language
 3-Hydroxyaspartic acid
 Barnstable Municipal Airport, in Massachusetts, United States
 Hungarian Yachting Association
 Hyampolis, a city in Phocis, Ancient Greece
 Hydra (constellation)
 Ia of Cornwall, 5th- or 6th-century Christian martyr